Joseph Isaac (born 1969) is a Dominican politician from Dominica Labour Party, serving as Speaker of the House of Assembly of Dominica since 2020.

Isaac is a former member of House of Assembly of Dominica from UWP, but crossed floor for DLP. He was not elected in the 2019 elections. He was appointed a DLP candidate for Speaker of the House, and was sworn in on 10 February 2020.

References

Living people
Dominica Labour Party politicians
Speakers of the House of Assembly of Dominica
1969 births